Mezidemestan Kadın ("merry woman", also Mezidimestan Kadın; born Kadriye Kamile Merve Mikanba; 3 March 1869 – 21 January 1909) was the sixth consort of Sultan Abdul Hamid II of the Ottoman Empire.

Early life
Mezidemestan Kadın was born in 1869. Born as Kadriye Kamile Merve Mikanba, she was a member of Abkhazian noble family Mikanba. Her father was Kaymat Bey Mikanba. She had been brought to Istanbul when she was young, where she was entrusted to the entourage of Sultan Murad V, Abdülhamid II's older half-brother. Here her name according to the custom of the Ottoman court was changed to Mezidemestan. She was tall, with dark brown hair and brown eyes. She was known for her extreme shyness. She was aunt of Emine Nazikeda Hanım, future consort of Sultan Mehmed VI, Abdülhamid II's younger half-brother.

Marriage
Mezidimestan married Abdul Hamid on 2 February 1885 at the Yıldız Palace. She was given the title of "Fifth Kadın". On 19 December 1885, after ten months of the wedding, she gave birth to her only son, Şehzade Mehmed Burhaneddin. Mehmed Burhaneddin was the most favourite son of Abdul Hamid. As the mother of the sultan's favourite son she was very influential but never abused her position; instead, she was known for helping everyone and even her step-children loved her.

In 1895, she was elevated to the title of "Fourth Kadın", and in 1901, she was elevated to the title of "Third Kadın". Abdul Hamid had presented her a villa located on the grounds of Yıldız Palace. She was beautiful, had black eyes, black eyebrows, and thick black hair.

Death
Mezidimestan died of stomach cancer, on 21 January 1909, just three months before the overthrow of Abdul Hamid, at the age of thirty-nine in the Yıldız Palace, and was buried in Yahya Efendi Cemetery, Istanbul.

Issue

See also
Kadın (title)
Ottoman Imperial Harem
List of consorts of the Ottoman sultans

References

Sources

1869 births
1909 deaths
19th-century consorts of Ottoman sultans
People from the Ottoman Empire of Abkhazian descent
Abdul Hamid II
20th-century consorts of Ottoman sultans